This is a list of adult nonfiction books that topped The New York Times Nonfiction Best Seller list in 1975.

See also

 1975 in literature
 New York Times Fiction Best Sellers of 1975
 Lists of The New York Times Nonfiction Best Sellers
 Publishers Weekly list of bestselling novels in the United States in the 1970s

References

1975
.
1975 in the United States